Hypoperigea is a genus of moths of the family Noctuidae.

Species
 Hypoperigea lunulata Holloway, 1979
 Hypoperigea medionota Hampson, 1920
 Hypoperigea tonsa (Guenée, 1852)
 Hypoperigea turpis (Walker, [1858])

References
Natural History Museum Lepidoptera genus database
Hypoperigea at funet

Hadeninae